The Sounds of Solid is the second studio album by the American rock band Sugartooth, released in September 1996. The album was recorded with production team The Dust Brothers.

The album received a two and a half star rating from the Los Angeles Times.

Track listing
Club Foot - 3:06
Booty Street - 3:14
Spiral - 3:17
All for Me - 1:53
Otra Vez - 3:14
Come on In - 3:37
Toothless - 3:32
Harajuana - 2:00
Solid - 4:02
Seven & Seven - 2:34
Frisbee - 2:50
We'd - 3:32

Personnel
Marc Hutner - vocals, guitar
Timothy Michael Gruse - guitar
Josh Blum - bass
Dusty Watson - drums

References

External links
The Sounds of Solid at Allmusic
Sugartooth (Official Website)

1997 albums
Sugartooth albums
Albums produced by the Dust Brothers
Geffen Records albums